This is a list of the Cayman Islands national football team results.

Exhibition matches

1990s

1990

1991

1992

1993

1996

2000s

2000

2004

2008

2010s

2011

2015

2019

2020s

2021

2022

2023

References
FIFA
RSSSF

results